Simon Njami (born 1962 in Lausanne) is a writer and an independent curator, lecturer, art critic and essayist.

He published his first novel "Cercueil et Cie" in 1985, followed by "Les Enfants de la Cité" in 1987, and "Les Clandestins" and "African Gigolo" in 1989. He has written biographies of James Baldwin and Léopold Sédar Senghor, several short texts, scripts for cinema, and documentary films.

Njami is the co-founder of Revue Noire, a journal of contemporary African and extra-occidental art, and he was Visiting Professor at UCSD (University of San Diego California).

After conceiving the Ethnicolor Festival in Paris in 1987, he curated many international exhibitions being among the first ones to think and show African contemporary artists work on international stages.  He has served as Artistic Director of Bamako Encounters, the African Photography Biennale, from 2001 to 2007. Njami is the curator of "Africa Remix", showed in Düsseldorf (Museum Kunst Palast), London (Hayward Gallery), Paris (Centre Pompidou), Tokyo (Mori Museum), Stockholm (Moderna Museet) and Johannesburg (Johannesburg Art Gallery), from 2004 to 2007.  He co-curated the first African Pavilion at the 52nd Venice Biennale. He curated the first African Art Fair, held in Johannesburg in 2008, and was the Artistic Director of Luanda Triennale (2010), Picha (Lumumbashi Biennale – 2010), SUD (Douala Triennale – 2010), among others exhibitions and international art events.

The exhibition "The Divine Comedy – Heaven, Hell, Purgatory by Contemporary African Artists" was shown at MMK (Museum für Moderne Kunst, Frankfurt am Main) from 21 March to 27 July 2014, The SCAD Museum of Art from 16 October to 25 January and at Smithsonian Institution/ African Art Museum, Washington, from 8 April to 1 November 2015.

Simon Njami is the Artistic Director of the Edition 12 of Dak'art, the Dakar Biennale, in Senegal from May, 3 to June 2, 2016 and the Edition 13 of the Dakar Biennale in May–June, 2017.
He curated "Afriques Capitales" in La Villette (Paris) and Gare Saint-Sauveur (Lille), in France, showed from March to September 2017.

Invited to be part of numerous art and photography juries, such as the World Press Photo Contest, Njami is the Art Adviser of the Sindika Dokolo Foundation (Luanda) and the Artistic Director of the Donwahi Foundation (Abidjan) and member of the scientific boards of numerous museums.

He is currently directing "AtWork", an itinerant and digital project with Lettera27 Foundation, in partnership with Moleskine, as well as the Pan African Master Classes in Photography, a project that he conceived with the Goethe Institut.

Publications by Njami
Cercueil et Cie, novel, Lieu Commun, Paris, 1985
Les Enfants de la Cité, novel, Gallimard, Folio Junior, Paris, 1987
African Gigolo, novel, Seghers, 1989
Les Clandestins, novel, Gallimard, Folio Junior, Paris, 1989
James Baldwin ou le devoir de violence, biography, Seghers, Paris, 1991
C'était Senghor, biography, Fayard, Paris, 2006

Exhibitions (selected)
 "I've been abducted hundreds of times", a solo show by Gosha Ostretsov, curated by Simon Njami, Venice Biennale, Palazzo Nani Bernardo, May–June, 2017.
 Afriques Capitales, La Villette, Paris, and Gare Saint-Sauveur, Lille, France, March - September, 2017.
 "The City in the Blue Daylight", Dak'art, The Dakar Biennale, 2 May - 3 June 2016
 Santu Mofokeng, Mets Solo, Fondazione Fotografia Modena, March 2016
 Something Else, Off Biennale Cairo, 2015
 Après Eden, Maison Rouge, Paris, 2015
 Xenopolis, Deutsche Bank KunstHalle, Berlin, 2015
 The Divine Comedy: Heaven, Purgatory and Hell Revisited by Contemporary African Artists, MMK (Museum für Moderne Kunst), Frankfurt am Main, 2014 - SCAD Museum, Savannah, USA, 2014-2015 - Smithsonian Institution/ African Art Museum, Washington, 2015
 WIR SIND ALLE BERLINER: 1884-2014, SAVVY Contemporary, Berlin, Germany, 15 November 2014 – 28 February 2015
Portrait of Marrakech, Magnum Photos and Marrakech Museum for Photography and Visual Art (MMP+), 2013
Art at Work, co-produced by the Palais des Beaux-Arts, Brussels, Co-curator with David Adjaye, Kampala, Ouganda, 2012.
Dokolo/Revue Noire Collection, Bamako encounters, 2011
Moataz Nasr, Chain reaction, Chateau de Blandy, France, 2011
Art at Work, co-produced by the Palais des Beaux-Arts, Brussels, Co-curator with David Adjaye, Ouagadougou, Addis Ababa, 2010
A Collective Diary, Herzilya Museum, Israel, 2010
Fiction#3, Bili Bidjocka, Abbaye de Maubuisson, France, May 2010
A useful dream, Palais des Beaux-Arts, Brussels, June 2010
As you like it (First African contemporary art fair), Johannesburg, March 2008
Artistic director of the Luanda Triennale, sept/dec 2010
Artistic Director of Picha (Lubumbabshi biennale), Oct 2010
Artistic director of SUD (Douala triennale), dec 2010
Ordinary pain, Noorderlicht festival Groningen, September 2009
Made in Africa, The Dokolo Collection, National Museum, Nairobi, 2009
Beyond the Desert, Darb 1718, Cairo, 2009
Co-Curator of the First African Pavilion at the 52e Venice Biennale, 2007
The Invention of memory, Réunion Island, September 2007
Chief curator of the VIIe Rencontres de Bamako, November 2007
L'image révélée, Tunis, 2006
Cities scape, ARCO 2006
Chief curator of les Rencontres africaines de la Photographie, Bamako, 2005
Africa Remix, Düsseldorf, Londres, Paris, Tokyo, Stockholm, Johannesburg, 2004/2007
Un prisme lucide – photographies, Biennale de São Paulo, São Paulo, 2004
Chief curator of les Rencontres africaines de la Photographie, Bamako, 2003
Up and Coming, ARCO, Madrid, 2003
Co-commissaire de Next Flag, Bruxelles, Zürich, 2002
Chief curator of les Rencontres africaines de la Photographie, Bamako, 2001
Le temps de l'Afrique, Las Palmas, 2000, Madrid, 2001
Biennale d'Art contemporain de Dakar (co-curator), Dakar, mai 2000
L'Afrique par elle-même, photographies (co-curator), Paris, São Paulo, Londres, Bamako, Washington, Berlin, Cape Town, 1998/1999
Traces of Identity, photographies, Toronto, 1997
Suites Africaines (co-curator), Couvent des Cordeliers, Paris, 1997
Die Andere Reise, Vienne, 1996
Otro Pais, Las Palmas, Palma de Majorque, Barcelone, 1995
Paris Connection, Paris/San Francisco, 1991
Ethnicolor, Paris, 1987

Texts and co-editions (selection)
Ethnicolor, edited with Bruno Tilliette, Autrement, Paris, 1987
El Anatsui, un artiste sur le fil de l'histoire, in El Anatsui, A Sculpted History of Africa, October Gallery, Saffron Books, London, 1998
Remembrance of things Past, Ten years of debate about African Contemporary Art, Tobu Museum of Art, 1998
Co-editor and co-author of Rotimi Fani-Kayodé et Alex Hirst, Photographs, Revue Noire/Autograph, Paris/Londres, 1996
Co-editor of Pierre Verger, Le Messager, photographies, Revue Noire, Paris 1993, DAP, New York, 1996
Co-editor and co-author of the Anthology of African Photography, Revue Noire, Paris, 1997, DAP, New York, 1999
L'invention de la vie, in Peut-on être vivant en Afrique, Presses Universitaires de France, 2000
Der Kurator als Nackter König, Kontextualisierung und Dekontextualisierung, in the catalogue South meets West, Kunsthalle Bern, 2000
Les Spores de l'étamine, in the catalogue of the exhibition Afriques, Barcelona, 2001
Chroniques d'un millénaire / Chronicles of a Millennium, introduction au catalogue des IVè Rencontres de la Photographie Africaine de Bamako, Eric Koehler, Paris, 2001
Pascale Marthine Tayou, Between himself and the Other, with Pierre-Olivier Rollin, text for the documenta 11, published by the Communauté Wallonie-Bruxelles, 2002
Das doppelte glück der sanftmut und der bitterkeit, in the catalogue of Africa Apart, NGBK, Berlin, 2002
A certain View of Mankind, for the exhibition Portraits of Pride, Samuel Fosso, Seydou Keita, Malick Sidibé, Moderna Museet Stockholm, Raster Forlag, 2002
Cronicas del hijo de un siglo, Espacio C, Camargo, 2002
El Corazon de las luces, in Planeta Kurtz, Random House Mondadori, Barcelona, 2002
Jane Alexander, A Turbulent Silence, introduction to the catalogue of Daimler Chrysler Award, Hatje Cantz, 2002
Co-curator and co-author of BLINK, photographies, Phaidon Press, London, 2002
Co-editor and co-author of the Antholoy of XXth Century African Art, Revue Noire, Paris, 2001, DAP, New York, 2002
Lettre à une jeune fille, in Babylon Babies – Marie-Jo Lafontaine, Hatje Cantz, 2003
Memory in the Skin, Looking both Ways catalogue, Museum for African Art, New York, Snoeck, Gent, 2003
Mozart and Me, Fernando Alvim – the Psychoanalysis of the World, Ingrid Mwangi, 2003
The End of the Empire, catalogue de l'exposition Happyness, Mori Art Museum, Tankosha Publishing Co, Kyoto/Tokyo, 2003
Le mystère révélé/ The Mystery revealed, introduction au catalogue des V Rencontres de la Photographie Africaine de Bamako, Eric Koehler, Paris, 2003
Zineb Sedira, An Assumed Autobiography, Corner House, London, 2004
A Young Woman in Quest, the work of Loulou Cherinet, catalogue Biennale de Sydney, 2004
Chaos et Métamorphose, introduction à l’exposition Africa Remix, Hatje Cantz, 2004
Claude Rosticher : la poésie à l’œuvre, Monaco, 2004
Editor of L’Afrique en regards, une brève histoire de la photographie, Filigranes, Paris, 2005
Amal Kenawy, catalogue de la Biennale de Sydney, 2005
L'image révélée, catalogue of exhibition, 2006
Introduction to Youssef Nabil's works (catalogue), 2007
Introduction to Ghada Amer's works, 2007
Introduction to Moataz Nasr's works (catalogue), 2008
Introduction de Andrew Tshabangu's works (monograph), 2008
Introduction to Ingrid Mwangi's works (catalogue), 2008
The constant Gardner, an introduction to Mechac Gaba's work, 2009
Un mystère à conserver (on the French photographer Laurence Leblanc.), 2009
Une illusion sophistiquée (on the Ethiopian photographer Aida Muluneh), 2009
Street Urchin, works by Kiluanji Kia Henda, Steidl, Germany, 2010
Dorian Gray in Bangui, works by Samuel Fosso, La Fabrica/Revue Noire Publishers, France, Spain, 2010
Me and Ms A., Exhibition book of Jane Alexander's works, 2010
Yinka Shonibare, MBE : le masque transparent, Exhibition book of Yinka Shonibare's Works, Nouveau Musée National de Monaco, 5 Continents, 2010
Editor of the artist's book, Moataz Nasr, The other Side of the Mirror, Gliori publishers, 2010
Samuel Fosso, a dandy in Bangui, Revue Noire/La Fabrica, 2011
The Impudence of the Stars, in Light Years, an exhibition of the Spanish artist Eugènia Balcells, Edicions de l'Eixample, Barcelona, 2012
The Re-enchantment of the World, an introduction to the work of the Congolese artist Pume, Revue Noire, Paris, 2012
Stabat Mater, an introduction to the work of the Haitian artist Mario Benjamin, Revue Noire, Paris, 2012
Fictional Faculties, IUAV, University of Venice, Venice, 2012
Invisibility, Fondazione di Venezia, Venice, 2012
Sam Nhlengethwa, Variations on a thème, 2012
Ananias Léki, Fragments, Goethe-Institut Nairobi, 2012
Allons enfants !, in Intense Proximité, Une anthologie du Proche et du Lointain, La Triennale, 2012
Of Curating and Audiences/ Art at Work, 2012
Zwelethu Mthethwa, a contemporary myth, Revue Noire/La Fabrica, 2012
Issa Samb (The stranger), Word ! Word ? Word !, edited by Koyo Kouoh, Office for Contemporary Art Norway (OCA) and Raw Material Company, 2013
Imagined Communities, in Condition Report, Symposium on Building Art Institutions in Africa, edited by Koyo Kouoh, Hatje Cantz and Raw Material Company, Dakar, 2013
The Burst of Silence, in Deutscher Pavilion 2013, 55th International Art Exhibition, edited by Susanne Gaensheimer, Gestalten, 2013
Heaven can wait, introduction to the catalogue of the photographer Thabiso Sekgala, 2014
Le cœur absolu, on the V12 Laraki by Eric Van Hove, monography, Marrakech, 2014
 Le prince à la tour abolie, Thierry Fontaine, L'invention d'une île, 2014

Cinema and documentary films 
Balck Micmac (collaboration), a film by Thomas Gilou, 1986
Black Power, Black Music: a documentary film in a thematic evening written and directed with Jean-François Bizot, Arte, 1994
Le complot d'Aristote (screenplay), a film by Jean Pierre Bekolo, 1996
Lhoooby, documentary on African Contemporary Art, co-directed and written with Pascale Marthine Tayou and Jean-Loup Pivin, Arte, 1997
Le Président, a film by Jean Pierre Bekolo, 2013

References

1962 births
Cameroonian art curators
Cameroonian male writers
Living people
People from Lausanne
Swiss curators